Bongolo Dam, (also spelled Bonkolo) is located on the Komani River, near Queenstown, Eastern Cape, South Africa. The wall was begun in 1905 and was for years the largest concrete dam wall in South Africa. Incidentally the origin of the name Bongola has caused some controversy, but it is believed by some to have been derived from the Xhosa language word mbongolo meaning donkey, as these animals were extensively used in the construction of the dam.

See also
 List of reservoirs and dams in South Africa
 List of rivers of South Africa

References 

 List of South African Dams from the Department of Water Affairs

1908 establishments in South Africa
Buildings and structures in the Eastern Cape
Dams completed in 1908
Dams in South Africa